Fedoro-Petrovka is a rural locality (a village) in Pervomaysky Selsoviet, Sterlitamaksky District, Bashkortostan, Russia. The population was 2 as of 2010. There is 1 street.

Geography 
Fedoro-Petrovka is located 43 km northwest of Sterlitamak (the district's administrative centre) by road. Pervomayskoye is the nearest rural locality.

References 

Rural localities in Sterlitamaksky District